Rick Schnall (born 1970) is an American businessman, partner in private equity firm Clayton, Dubilier & Rice, and minority owner of the Atlanta Hawks.

Biography
Born to a Jewish family, Schnall is a graduate of the University of Pennsylvania and the Harvard Business School. After school, he worked for Smith Barney and Donaldson Lufkin & Jenrette. In 1996, he joined Clayton, Dubilier & Rice eventually reaching partner where was responsible for the acquisition and sales. His uncle is Carl Icahn.

Atlanta Hawks
In 2015, Schnall was part of a group led by Tony Ressler along with Grant Hill, Sarah Blakely, Jesse Itzler, and Steven Price,  that successfully purchased the Atlanta Hawks for $850 million.

Schnall lives in New York.

References

1970 births
American sports owners
Harvard Business School alumni
Living people
University of Pennsylvania alumni
Atlanta Hawks executives
Jewish American sportspeople